= Obraztsovo (Oryol district) =

Obratsovo
- Interactive map of Obratsovo
- Location of Obratsovo Obratsovo (Oryol Oblast)
- Coordinates: 52.955351°N 35.968328°E
- Country: Russia
- Federal subject: Oryol Oblast

Population
  - Estimate (2021): 4,083 )

Municipal status
  - Municipal district: Oryol
- Time zone: UTC+3 (MSK)
- Postal code: 302523
- OKTMO ID: 54647425141

Obratsovo (Russian: Образцово) is a village in Oryol Oblast, Russia.

== Population ==
According to the results of the 2002 census, Russians made up 94% of the inhabitants.

From 2004 to 2021, within the framework of the local government organization, the village was part of the Obraztsovskoye rural settlement, which was abolished along with the transformation of the municipal district with all other settlements by merging them into the Orlovsky municipal district.
